Sicyopus jonklaasi, the lipstick goby, is a species of goby endemic to Sri Lanka where they occur in rocky hill streams of swift-flowing water.  They having sucking discs on their undersides with which they adhere to the sides of rocks.  Newly hatched larvae are washed to the sea by heavy flows brought on by rains and mature there before returning to the streams.  This species can reach a length of  TL.  It can also be found in the aquarium trade.

References

Fish of Sri Lanka
jonklaasi
Taxa named by Herbert R. Axelrod
Taxonomy articles created by Polbot
Fish described in 1972